The Tainan TSG GhostHawks are a Taiwanese professional basketball team based in Tainan City, Taiwan. They have competed in the T1 League since the 2021–22 season, and play their home games at the Chia Nan University of Pharmacy and Science Shao Tsung Gymnasium. The GhostHawks became one of the six teams of the inaugural T1 League season.

Home arenas 
 Chia Nan University of Pharmacy and Science Shao Tsung Gymnasium (2021–present)

Current roster

Personnel

General managers

Head coaches

Season-by-season record

Notable players 
Local players
  Chien Wei-Ju (簡偉儒) – Chinese Taipei men's national basketball team player
  Han Chieh-Yu (韓杰諭) – Chinese Taipei men's national basketball team player
  Hu Kai-Hsiang (胡凱翔) – Chinese Taipei men's national basketball team player
  Ku Mao Wei-Chia (谷毛唯嘉) – Chinese Taipei men's national basketball team player
  Li Han-sheng (李漢昇) – Chinese Taipei men's national basketball team player
  Wu Hung-Hsing (吳宏興) – Chinese Taipei men's national basketball team player
  Wu Tai-Hao (吳岱豪) – Chinese Taipei men's national basketball team player
Type-III players
  William Artino – Chinese Taipei men's national basketball team player
Import players
  Sim Bhullar – NBA player
  Taylor Braun – United States men's national basketball team player
  Charles García – SBL Finals MVP (2019)
  Lester Prosper – Indonesia men's national basketball team player

References

External links 
 
 
 
 

 
T1 League teams
2021 establishments in Taiwan
Basketball teams established in 2021
Sport in Tainan